The 1956 Atlantic R6D-1 disappearance involved a Douglas R6D-1 Liftmaster (BuNo 131588) of the United States Navy which disappeared over the Atlantic Ocean on 10 October 1956 with the loss of all 59 people on board.

Accident 
The R6D-1 – the U.S. Navy version of the United States Air Force C-118 Liftmaster and the civilian Douglas DC-6B airliner – was carrying a crew of nine and 50 passengers on a scheduled Military Air Transport Service flight from RAF Lakenheath, England, to Lajes Field in the Azores on 10 October 1956 when it disappeared over the Atlantic Ocean about 590 km (370 miles) southwest of Land's End, England, at approximately 22:10. All of the passengers were personnel of the U.S. Air Forces 307th Bombardment Wing stationed at Lincoln Air Force Base, Nebraska, returning to the United States from 90 days of temporary duty in England. The disappearance was the second major accident involving a Navy R6D-1 in 19 months, an R6D-1 having crashed in Hawaii in March 1955.

A 14-day search for the aircraft and survivors found only wheels and a life raft floating 596 km (370 miles) southwest of Lands End. No trace of the crew or passengers was ever found.

See also

List of accidents and incidents involving military aircraft (1955–1959)
1951 Atlantic C-124 disappearance
1955 Hawaii R6D-1 crash

References

Accidents and incidents involving United States Navy and Marine Corps aircraft
Aviation accidents and incidents in the Atlantic Ocean
Accidents and incidents involving the Douglas DC-6
Aviation accidents and incidents in 1956
1956 in England
1956 in Portugal
Missing aircraft
United States Navy in the 20th century
Military history of the Atlantic Ocean
October 1956 events